The most popular sport in Cameroon is football. The national team is traditionally one of the strongest teams on the African continent. They have participated in the World Cup 8 times, and in 1990 they reached the quarter-finals. It took extra time before England won the game 3–2. They have also won the African Cup of Nations 5 times as well as winning Olympic gold in Sydney in 2000. Among the most famous players are Roger Milla, Thomas N'Kono and Samuel Eto'o.

Competitions

National competitions 
Cameroonian Football Federation, nicknamed Fécafoot, has been organizing the Cameroon Football Championship since 1961. The most titled Club is the Cotonsport Garoua, 12 times champion. The championship has been renamed "MTN Elite One" Since the 2007 season and sponsorship by the South African telephone operator MTN.

Cup

The Cameroonian Cup was created in 1960. The Canon Yaoundé won it eleven times.

National team

Cameroon national football team, dubbed "the Indomitable Lions", is one of the most successful in Africa, winning five times the African Cup of Nations (1984, 1988, 2000, 2002, 2017). in 1990, Cameroon became the first African country to reach the quarter-finals of the World Cup. In 2000, it won the Olympic Games.

International competitions 

Cameroon organized the African Cup of Nations (CAN) in 1972, Yaoundé and Douala. The competition was won by the Congo. At that time congo was a single country

It also hosted the CEMAC Cup in 1988 and 2008.

Women's football

Cameroon women's national football team played its first game on 15 June 1991 in Nigeria (defeated 2–0) as Martin Spirit as Captain
. Cameroon has been runners up in Africa Women Cup of Nations in 1991, 2004 and 2014.  The national team competed for the first time at the 2012 Summer Olympics, and first qualified for the 2015 FIFA Women's World Cup.

References